The Glam Nation Tour (also known as GlamNation International) was the first headlining concert tour by American singer/songwriter Adam Lambert in support of his debut album, For Your Entertainment. The tour included over 100 shows in North America, Asia, Australia, and Europe.

Background
The tour was officially announced on April 28, 2010 via Lambert's website. To describe the tour, Lambert stated: "I hope the audience will be able to escape for a few hours and fall into a world full of glam, drama and excitement. I’m confident we’ve put together a show far beyond the price of the ticket. I’m looking forward to connecting with fans all across the world with this show"

Fellow American Idol alum Allison Iraheta, and Orianthi served as opening acts on select dates. In July, Orianthi cancelled several appearances before announcing she was leaving the second half of the tour.

On February 9, 2011, it was confirmed on Lambert's official website that a CD/DVD combo of the tour would  be released on March 22, 2011.

Opening acts
Orianthi (North America) (select dates)
Allison Iraheta (North America) (select dates)
Seth Haapu (New Zealand)
The Monday Box (Finland)
Viktorious (Sweden)
Random Hero (Germany)
Mytoybox (England)
Carrie Mac (Scotland)
The Canyons (Los Angeles)

Set list
"For Your Entertainment" (Video Introduction)
"Voodoo"
"Down the Rabbit Hole"
"Ring of Fire"
"Fever"
"Sleepwalker"
"Soaked"
"Whataya Want from Me"
"Aftermath"
"Sure Fire Winners"
"Strut"
"Music Again"
"Broken Open"1
"If I Had You"
Encore
"Mad World"1
"Whole Lotta Love"1
"20th Century Boy"1
"Enter Sandman"1
"Purple Haze"1
"A Change Is Gonna Come"1

1Performed at select dates

Source:

Tour dates

Music festivals and other miscellaneous performances

This concert is a part of the 2010 WSPK K*Fest
This concert is a part of the 2010 Chesaning Showboat Music Festival
This concert is a part of the 11th Annual Common Ground Music Festival
This concert is a part of The 2010 Orange County Fair
This concert is a part of The 2010 Musikfest
This concert is a part of the 2010 International de Montgolfières de Saint-Jean-sur-Richelieu
This concert is a part of The 2010 On the Waterfront Festival
This concert is a part of The 2010 Rays Summer Concert Series
This concert is a part of The 2010 Puyallup Fair
These concerts are a part of the 2010 Formula 1 Singtel Singapore Grand Prix

Rescheduled shows

Box office score data

Broadcast and recordings
It was announced on February 9, 2011 that a CD/DVD compilation entitled Glam Nation Live will be released. The show was recorded on the August 31st date in Indianapolis at Clowes Memorial Hall. The concert was directed by Doug Spangenberg and will "feature 12 tracks plus a bonus cut."

Personnel
Choreographer: Brooke Wendle
Musical Director: Monte Pittman
Make-up Artist: Sutan Amrull

Band
Dancers: Taylor Green, Sasha Mallory, Terrance Spencer and Brooke Wendle
Drums: Longineu W. Parsons III (June 4 – September 15), Isaac Carpenter (September 17 – December 16)
Guitar: Monte Pittman
Bass guitar: Tommy Joe Ratliff
Keyboards: Camila Grey
Supporting Vocals: Camila Grey and Monte Pittman

External links
 Adam Lambert official website

References

2010 concert tours
Adam Lambert concert tours

pt:Glam Nation Tour